Tibbehoy Creek is a stream in the U.S. state of Mississippi.

Tibbehoy is a name derived from a Native American language but its meaning is unclear.

References

Rivers of Mississippi
Rivers of Jones County, Mississippi
Mississippi placenames of Native American origin